Felicia's svenska suite, (English: Felicia's Swedish suite) is a music album recorded by the Swedish-Dutch folk singer-songwriter Cornelis Vreeswijk in 1978. Many of the songs feature Felicia, a woman character from Aksel Sandemose's 1958 novel Varulven.

Track listing

Con amore
"En duva till Felicia"
"Från en vän i viken"
"Felicias sonett"
"Felicia pratar..."
"Hon säger"
"Varulven"
"För gröna Felicia"

Lamentoso
"Klagovisa till Felicia"
"Vari Felicia beklagar sig (ty hon är förolämpad)"
"Gideon till Plautus"
"Till en nymf"
"Dubbelquatrin om tennis"

Furioso
"Byt nu ton"
"Polaren Per gör sin reverens"
"Möte med Fredrik Åkare, Stockholm 1943"
"Ballad om olika segelytor"
"De fattiga riddarnas ballad"
"Tre dagars blues"

Dubioso
"Turistens klagan"
"Rörande min Harpa"
"Balladen om Gustava"
"Vid råken"
"Felicia adjö"

References

Cornelis Vreeswijk albums
1978 albums